Anders Lund (born 14 February 1985 in Copenhagen) is a Danish former professional road bicycle racer, who competed as a professional between 2007 and 2013. He started his cycling career racing for Ordrup Cycle Club in the north of Copenhagen, and was reckoned to be a very talented climber and skilled all-rounder .

Lund retired at the end of the 2013 season, after seven seasons as a professional.

Major results

2002
2nd National Junior Road Race Championships
2003
1st  National Junior Road Race Championships
2nd World Junior Road Race Championships
2004
Circuit des Ardennes
1st Stages 1 & 5
2005
2nd European Under-23 Road Race Championships
2nd Overall Circuit des Ardennes
1st Stage 2
2nd U23 Liège–Bastogne–Liège
3rd National Under-23 Road Race Championships
5th Giro Belvedere di Villa di Cordignano
8th GP San Giuseppe
10th Overall Ringerike GP
2006
5th Ronde Van Vlaanderen Beloften
2007
6th GP Herning
2008
10th Overall Tour de Wallonie
2009
8th Route Adélie
2010
3rd National Road Race Championships
6th Overall Tour of Slovenia
8th Japan Cup

References

External links 

Profile at Team CSC official website

1985 births
Living people
Danish male cyclists
Cyclists from Copenhagen